Cang or CANG may refer to:

Cang County, in Hebei, China
Cangue, small device that was used for public humiliation
California National Guard
Canada goose, bird species alpha code used by banders
Cang Du is a Quincy of the Wandenreich and also member of the groups Sternritter from Bleach.